Nanularia is a genus of beetles in the family Buprestidae, containing the following species:

 Nanularia alpina Bellamy, 1987
 Nanularia brunneata (Knull, 1947)
 Nanularia californica (Horn, 1875)
 Nanularia cupreofusca Casey, 1909
 Nanularia monoensis Bellamy, 1987
 Nanularia obrienorum Knull, 1971
 Nanularia pygmaea (Knull, 1941)

References

Buprestidae genera